The men's 400 metres event at the 1967 Pan American Games was held in Winnipeg on 29 and 30 July.

Medalists

Results

Heats
Held on 29 July

Semifinals
Held on 29 July

Final
Held on 30 July

References

Athletics at the 1967 Pan American Games
1967